The Death of Leonardo da Vinci or Francis I Receives the Last Breaths of Leonardo da Vinci is an 1818 painting by the French artist Jean-Auguste-Dominique Ingres, showing the painter Leonardo da Vinci dying, with Francis I of France holding his head. It was commissioned by the Pierre Louis Jean Casimir de Blacas, the French ambassador in Rome, and now hangs in the Petit Palais in Paris.

Another version of the painting created  is held by the Smith College Museum of Art.

Description
The painting depicts the death of Leonardo da Vinci, an Italian artist and inventor, which took place in the Clos Lucé house, in Amboise, on May 2, 1519. As a source of inspiration for this painting, Ingres took up the story of the death of the painter present in the Lives of Giorgio Vasari. The king of France Francis I embraces the dying artist to receive his last breath, while other characters, including priests and servants, observe the scene. The young dauphin Francis of Valois sadly observes the scene and a cardinal places a hand on his shoulder to comfort him. On a table next to Leonardo's bed you can see a Bible and a small crucifix. The face of Francis I takes up a painting by Titian dating back to 1538.

References

1818 paintings
Paintings by Jean-Auguste-Dominique Ingres
Paintings about death
Works about Leonardo da Vinci
Paintings in the collection of the Petit Palais